Paulo Fernando de Moraes Farias, FBA, is a historian and Africanist specialising in epigraphic sources for the medieval history (5th to the 15th century) of West Africa as well as West African oral traditions and the Timbuktu Chronicles. Since his retirement in 2003, he has been Honorary Professor at the Department of African Studies and Anthropology at the University of Birmingham. After graduating from the Federal University of Bahia in 1963, Moreas Farias taught at Bahia's Centre for Afro-Oriental Studies and at the Central College of Salvador; his association with the National Union of Students led to harassment from the military government of Brazil after 1964, prompting him to flee to Africa. Settling with his family in Ghana, he completed a Master of Arts degree at the University of Ghana, but fled once again to Senegal and then Nigeria following the Ghanaian coup of 1966; two years later, he took up an academic post at the University of Birmingham in the United Kingdom, where he remained until retiring in 2003.

Honours 
In July 2017, Moraes Farias was elected a Fellow of the British Academy (FBA), the United Kingdom's national academy for the humanities and social sciences. Moraes Farias was the recipient of a ASAUK Distinguished Africanist award in 2017.

Selected works 
Moraes Farias published many scholarly articles, books and book chapters, including
 (Edited with K. Barber), Discourse and Its Disguises – The Interpretation of African Oral Texts (Centre of West African Studies, Birmingham University African Studies Series 1, 1989).
 (Edited with K. Barber), Self-Assertion and Brokerage – Early Cultural Nationalism in West Africa (Centre of West African Studies, Birmingham University African Studies Series 2, 1990).
 Arabic Medieval Inscriptions from the Republic of Mali: Epigraphy, Chronicles, and Songhay-Tuareg History, Fontes Historiae Africanae 4, new series (Oxford: Oxford University Press for The British Academy, 2003).
 (Edited with M. Diawara and G. Spittler) Heinrich Barth et l’Afrique (Cologne: Rüdiger Köppe Verlag, 2007).

External links
Videos:
 . Duration 1h:42m:48s. University of Birmingham, 20 September 2012.
 . The 2015 Fage Lecture given by Paulo Fernando de Moraes Farias. Duration 1h:04m:31s. University of Birmingham, 24 November 2015.
 . Archeology of Africa 20-21 September 2021. 17:30 Closing Conference - live, with Moraes Farias. Different sources for the construction of African history: a dialogue between documents, oral history and archaeological data. Duration 1h:37m:12s, Arqueologia da África , streamed live on 21 September 2021. In Portuguese.

References   

Living people
20th-century Brazilian historians
Federal University of Bahia alumni
University of Ghana alumni
Academics of the University of Birmingham
Fellows of the British Academy
Year of birth missing (living people)
21st-century Brazilian historians